Moses Regular Jr. (born October 30, 1971) is a former American football tight end who played one season with the New York Giants of the National Football League. He played college football at Missouri Valley College and attended Gateway High School in Kissimmee, Florida. He was also a member of the Frankfurt Galaxy of NFL Europe.

References

External links
Just Sports Stats

Living people
1971 births
Players of American football from Miami
American football linebackers
Missouri Valley Vikings football players
New York Giants players
Frankfurt Galaxy players
People from Kissimmee, Florida